The Bratilov is a left tributary of the river Milcovăț in Romania. It flows into the Milcovăț in the village Milcovățu.

References

Rivers of Romania
Rivers of Giurgiu County